Ary Bitter (1883–1973) was a French artist, best known for his animal sculptures. He was a designer, painter, and sculptor in various mediums including plaster, stone, terracotta and bronze.  His work was also produced in biscuit by the Sèvres factory.

Biography

Early life
Ary Jean Léon Bitter was born in Marseille in 1883. and In 1895 he enrolled at the Marseille Beaux Arts and was taught by Émile Aldebert and from 1913 by Jules Coutan. He was a successful student, winning first prize in sculpture in 1900 and in 1901 he received commendations both for sculpture and design. In 1902, courtesy of a bursary from the City of Marseille, he left for Paris and joined the studio of Louis-Ernest Barrias and in 1906 was admitted to the École nationale supérieure des Beaux-Arts.

Career
In 1910, his work "l'Enfant au chevreau" received an "honourable mention" and he carried off the school's "Chenavard" prize. The following year, in 1911, he won the "Lemaire" prize. and a  year later, in 1912, he exhibited at the Salon des Artistes Français and was a regular exhibitor there up until 1939. He won a bronze medal at the 1913 Salon and the silver medal at the 1921 Salon. In 1913, he worked on a public fountain in Nantes.

In 1921, he was commissioned to work on the Sanary-sur-Mer war memorial as well as those in the Marseille cemeteries of St Louis and St Jérôme. In 1923, he created a "mascot" for Mme Louis Renault's car. and 1924 saw him win the gold at that years Paris Salon and the next year he was one of the sculptors featured by the founder Susse Frères in an exhibition at the Boulevard de la Madeleine showroom. He was in fact commissioned by Susse Frères to work with them on several limited editions. 1926 saw his work as part of the decoration of Marseille's St Charles station and the work "Bonne Mère" for the Cathedral. In 1927, he exhibited the work "Chloé allongée" at the Salon. and 1931 saw him exhibit a bronze version of "Diane Chasseresse" and in 1932 he was made a "Chevalier de la Légion d'Honneur" and his "Cajolerie" was declared "hors concours" at that year's Salon. In 1935 he showed two works at the Salon, "Léda" and "Le  Cygne".

Further honours followed when in 1937 he was awarded a gold medal at the Exposition Internationale des Arts et des Techniques de Paris and he was invited to show work at the "Palais de la Céramique" and the "Palais du Métal". He was also given a "diplôme d'honneur" by the École nationale supérieure des Beaux-Arts. In 1938, he created ten works in terracotta for the Musée Hector-Berlioz and in 1940, 3 griffons for a fountain in Pithiviers. In 1949, he worked on the Cambo-les-Bains monument to Edmond Rostand.

Death
He died in Paris in 1973.

Main works

References

1883 births
1973 deaths
Sculptors from Marseille
École des Beaux-Arts alumni
20th-century French sculptors
French male sculptors